Lester Lee (November 7, 1903 – June 19, 1956) was an American composer. He was nominated for an Academy Award in the category Best Original Song for the film Miss Sadie Thompson. Lee was also the co-writer of "Pennsylvania Polka". Lee died in June 1956 of a heart attack in Los Angeles, California, at the age of 52.

Selected filmography 
 Miss Sadie Thompson (1953; co-nominated with Ned Washington)

References

External links 

1903 births
1956 deaths
People from New York (state)
American film score composers
American male film score composers
20th-century American composers